Synopsys is an American electronic design automation (EDA) company headquartered in Mountain View, California that focuses on silicon design and verification, silicon intellectual property and software security and quality. Synopsys supplies tools and services to the semiconductor design and manufacturing industry. Products include tools for logic synthesis and physical design of integrated circuits, simulators for development and debugging environments that assist in the design of the logic for chips and computer systems. Synopsys is also active in the automotive industry, supplying IP and design tools for autonomous vehicles and advanced driver-assistance systems. , the company is a component of both Nasdaq-100 and S&P 500 indices.

Synopsys has gained attention due to its relationship with various Chinese state entities. In 2018, Synopsys formed a partnership with the People's Liberation Army National Defence University and, in 2022, the company came under investigation by the United States Department of Justice for technology transfers to sanctioned entities in China.

History 
Synopsys was founded by Aart J de Geus and David Gregory in 1986 in Research Triangle Park, North Carolina. The company was initially established as Optimal Solutions with a charter to develop and market synthesis technology developed by the team at General Electric.

In 2022, Synopsys was reported to be under investigation by the United States Department of Commerce for unlawful technology transfers to sanctioned companies such as Huawei's HiSilicon and Semiconductor Manufacturing International Corporation.

In July 2022, agents from Taiwan's Ministry of Justice Investigation Bureau raided the offices of a Synopsys-backed firm on suspicion of illegally poaching engineers from TSMC.

Mergers and acquisitions 
Synopsys has made some silicon and design verification acquisitions.

CoWare 
CoWare was a supplier of platform-driven electronic system-level (ESL) design software and services acquired by Synopsys in February 2010.

Code Dx 

Code Dx was an American software technology company active from 2015 to 2021. The company's self-titled flagship product is a vulnerability management system that combines and correlates the results generated by a wide variety of static and dynamic testing tools. It was acquired by Synopsys in 2021.

Avanti Corporation 
Avanti Corporation (styled as "Avant!) was founded when several former Cadence Design Systems employees bought the startup ArcSys, which was previously merged with Integrated Silicon Solutions (ISS), gaining Avanti its design rule checking and layout versus schematic tool Hercules (including 3D silicon structure modeling), then bought Compass Design Automation, which had fully integrated IC design flow and ASIC libraries, especially its place and route tool, which Avanti reworked to create Saturn and Apollo II; and it also bought TMA (Technology Modeling Associates) which brought their pioneering TCAD and Proteus optical proximity correction tools. This was, by far, Synopsys' most significant and controversial acquisition. At the time Avanti was the #4 company in the EDA industry, and was struggling with a major lawsuit from Cadence for software theft. Avanti was merged into Synopsys on June 6, 2002, during the litigation. Synopsys paid Cadence about $265 million more to end all litigation. Soon after the settlement, the California Supreme Court upheld the lower court's earlier decision. Synopsys then paid an additional $26.1 million to Silvaco to settle two of three Silvaco's suits against Meta-Software, earlier purchased by Avanti, and its president. The lawsuits were filed in 1995 and inherited by Avanti.

Magma Design Automation 
Synopsys agreed to buy its competitor Magma Design Automation for about $500 million in an all-cash deal in November 2011. 

The two companies previously faced drawn-out back and forth patent disputes since 2004, which started when Synopsys accused Magma's co-founder Lukas van Ginneken of conceiving the technology used in their products to be based on the work while he was still employed at Synopsys. While van Ginneken later acknowledged the claim, Magma and Synopsys continued disputing each others patents. The litigations were eventually settled in 2007, with Magma paying Synopsys $12.5 million, and the companies agreeing to cross-license the disputed patents to each other.

Novas Software 
Novas Software was a company founded in 1996 to address debugging of chip designs. Novas was purchased by Taiwan-based EDA company SpringSoft in May 2008. SpringSoft and Novas were acquired by Synopsys in 2012.

Numerical Technologies 
Numerical Technologies, Inc. was a San Jose-based electronic design automation public (NASDAQ: NMTC) company. The company was primarily known for its intellectual property, software tools and services covering phase-shifting mask technology. On March 3, 2003, it was acquired by Synopsys.

SpringSoft 
SpringSoft is a software company that developed VLSI design and debugging software. The company was founded with a grant from the Taiwanese National Science Council in February 1996.

In 1997, SpringSoft established Novas Software in Silicon Valley to market Springsoft's VLSI Debugging software. SpringSoft created a custom layout tool called Laker and a US-based company called Silicon Canvas. In May 2008, SpringSoft purchased Novas Software Silicon Canvas and combined them to form the wholly owned subsidiary SpringSoft USA. SpringSoft employed over 400 people with office locations across the world.

Synopsys announced its acquisition of SpringSoft in 2012.

Synplicity 
Synplicity Inc. was a supplier of software for the design of programmable logic devices (FPGAs, PLDs, and CPLDs) used for communications, military/aerospace, consumer, semiconductor, computer and other electronic systems. Synplicity's tools provided logic synthesis, physical synthesis, and verification functions for FPGA, FPGA-based ASIC prototyping, and DSP designers. Synplicity was listed on Nasdaq until it was acquired by Synopsys for $227 million in a transaction finalized May 15, 2008.

ARC International 
ARC International PLC was the designer of ARC (Argonaut RISC Core) embedded processors, which were widely used in SoC devices for IoT, storage, digital home, mobile, and automotive applications. Virage Logic, which acquired ARC International in 2009, was sold to Synopsys in 2010.

Coverity 
In February 2014, Synopsys agreed to acquire static code analysis vendor Coverity for $375million. Synopsys had relied on Coverity’s products for around ten years to find and fix defects in software code before it is released, improving software security, prior to the acquisition.

Coverity's open source Coverity Scan tool was hacked and used for cryptocurrency mining in February 2018. Synopsys took down the service for four weeks and confirmed the incident did not affect any of its corporate network and found no evidence of data abuse of its open source users.

QuantumWise 
In 2017 Synopsys acquired the atomic-scale modeling software company QuantumWise (former Atomistix), which provides tools for quantum-based and classical simulations in the field of material science.

Black Duck Software 

Black Duck Software was a privately held company focused on automating the process of identifying and creating an inventory of open source code used in software applications, as well as detecting known security vulnerabilities and license compliance issues. Black Duck Software was acquired by Synopsys in December 2017.

WhiteHat Security 

In April 2022, Synopsys announced the acquisition of WhiteHat Security for $330 million. WhiteHat Security was founded in 2001 and provides application security as well as insights for DevOps teams.

Divisions 
Synopsys has three divisions: Silicon Design and Verification, Silicon Intellectual Property, and Software Integrity.

The Silicon Design and Verification division focuses the design and verification of integrated circuits and designing more advanced processes and models for the manufacturing of those chips.

The Silicon Intellectual Property division focuses on intellectual property for system-on-a-chip (SoC) designs.

The Software Integrity division provides products and services for software security and quality control, including software for DevOps environments, application security programs, software testing tools, and tools for software licensing audits.

Partnerships 
In 2018, Synopsys partnered with the People's Liberation Army National Defence University to provide field-programmable gate array design training.

See also 
List of EDA companies
Comparison of EDA software
List of tools for static code analysis
Security information and event management
Dynamic application security testing

References

External links 

Electronic design automation companies
Electronics companies of the United States
Technology companies based in the San Francisco Bay Area
Companies based in Mountain View, California
American companies established in 1986
Electronics companies established in 1986
1986 establishments in North Carolina